Liverpool Sound City is an annual music festival and industry conference in Liverpool, England. Founded in 2008 by Dave Pichilingi (also founder of Modern Sky UK), Sound City was located in Liverpool City Centre venues, such as The Kazimier, The Zanzibar and the Liverpool Cathedral, until 2015 when it was relocated to Bramley-Moore Dock in Liverpool's historic docklands.

In 2015, the festival took place on Friday 22 May – Sunday 24 May, with headliners The Vaccines, The Flaming Lips and Belle and Sebastian and an array of artists including, Everything Everything, Peace and The Cribs. Previous artists include Florence and the Machine, The Maccabees, The xx, The Kooks and Ed Sheeran.

The Sound City conference is a two-day digital industry conference featuring keynotes, in conversations and workshop sessions from key digital industry figures. In 2015, the conference took place on Thursday 21 May - Friday 22 May in the Titanic Hotel at Stanley Dock. Speakers included Wayne Coyne of The Flaming Lips, Ramones manager Danny Fields and Mark E. Smith of The Fall.

Previous line-ups

2008 
 Reverend and The Makers
 Mystery Jets
 Laura Marling
 The Wombats
 Santigold
 Lightspeed Champion

2009 
 White Lies
 Black Lips
 The xx
 The Rascals
 White Denim

2010 
 Paloma Faith
 The Maccabees (band)
 Speech Debelle
 Gil Scott-Heron
 British Sea Power
 The Fall
 Delphic
 Chilly Gonzales

2011 
 The View
 Frank Turner
 The Kooks
 The Black Lips
 Funeral Party
 Jamie xx
 Ed Sheeran
 Miles Kane

2012 
 The Temper Trap
 Alt-J
 Mystery Jets
 Professor Green
 James Vincent McMorrow
 Ghostpoet
 Django Django
 Niki and The Dove

2013 
 Noah and The Whale
 Dexys Midnight Runners
 Reverend and The Makers
 The Walkmen
 Everything Everything
 Darwin Deez
 Delphic
 Unknown Mortal Orchestra
 Enter Shikari
 AlunaGeorge

2014 
 Kodaline
 Albert Hammond Jr
 Jon Hopkins
 Gruff Rhys
 The Hold Steady
 Royal Blood
 Clean Bandit
 Jungle
 Courtney Barnett
 Jagwar Ma
 Years and Years
 The Kooks

2015 
 The Vaccines
 The Flaming Lips
 Belle and Sebastian
 Everything Everything
 Gaz Coombes
 The Cribs
 The Thurston Moore Band
 The Ghost of a Saber Tooth Tiger
 Peace
 Fat White Family
 Swans (band)
 Fucked Up
 Unknown Mortal Orchestra
 Roni Size

2016 
 Catfish and the Bottlemen
 The Coral
 Sleaford Mods
 Circa Waves
 Band of Skulls
 The Dandy Warhols
 Pete Doherty
 Dilly Dally
 Young Fathers
 The Big Moon
 Kagoule
 False Advertising (band)

Arts 
Screenadelica is a large gig poster exhibition that has toured and exhibited across England, Europe and the world. It is essentially a 'pop up' gallery celebrating the art of the screen printed gig poster. The works include UK and international artists from the gig-poster 'scene'. These artists have full band and management support to design for The Pixies, DJ Shadow, Björk, The Cure, PJ Harvey, Brian Wilson, Kellis, Gogal Bordello and many more. The art works can be bought at an average price of £30 a piece. Screenadelica host a wide variety of styles promoting the bands that the artists love, inspired by the music they hear.

Film 
As part of the Liverpool Sound City arts expansion program, films, music videos and shots have been encouraged presenting and demonstrating throughout the years. These come from variety of venues including FACT, Camp&Furnace and Tabac.

LSC match day 
By partnering with Umbro, the festival also brings John Peel World Cup – a five-a-side football tournament. The teams made up of band members and industry professionals competed for the cup. Funds raised from the event go to the British Heart Foundation, in memory of John Peel, whose two great loves were music and Liverpool FC.

Photography 
In 2009, photographer Kevin Cummins discussed his portfolio at the festival. This portfolio played a part in the rise of both "Madchester" and "Britpop" and includes artists such as Joy Division, The Stone Roses, Manic Street Preachers, R.E.M., U2, Patti Smith, Marc Bolan, The Smiths, Oasis, Foo Fighters and Buzzcocks. In 2012, music photographer Gered Mankowitz attended the event as well. Mankowitz has photographed some of the most famous musicians of the 20th century such as The Rolling Stones, Kate Bush and Jim Hendrix. Notable photographers who have attended the festival include Bill Harry, Mark McNulty, Kevin Cummins, and Ernie Paniccioli. Liverpool Sound also works with local universities and communities to provide photography students an opportunity to develop their skills, gain experience and expand their portfolios.

Tickets 
Liverpool Sound City tickets are in the form of wristbands. In order to get these wristbands, one must purchase a ticket on the official website and the ticket purchased will have information on collecting the wristbands.

References

External links
Official Liverpool Sound City Website

Festivals in Liverpool